The Mättlenstöck (2,808 m) is a mountain in the Glarus Alps, located between Linthal and Elm in the canton of Glarus. It lies north of the Hausstock, on the range separating the two main valleys of Glarus: the main Linth valley on the west and the Sernftal on the east.

References

External links
 Mättlenstöck on Hikr

Mountains of the Alps
Mountains of Switzerland
Mountains of the canton of Glarus